Apārangi Planitia is a large plain on Mercury, approximately 1077 km across. It was named in 2017 by the IAU.

The crater Faulkner forms the northeastern part of the Planitia.  Firdousi crater lies on the western margin, and Bagryana lies on the southeastern margin.

References

Surface features of Mercury